Kutubi Muhammed Musliyar (Arabic:كتبي محمّد مسليار, Malayalam: ഖുതുബി മുഹമ്മദ് മുസ്ലിയാര്) was a great scholar hailing from Kerala and advisor of Samastha Kerala Jamiyyathul Ulama. He contributed unique works in the foundation of many institutions throughout Kerala and was a nightmare for the novelty based groups.

Early life
He was born to Cheruchal Ahmed in 1881 CE (1299 AH), at Cheppiyalam village. After the primary education at native village, he was admitted in Talakkaduthur Juma Masjid Darse (Masjid based college) which was run under Poker Musliyar, father of Sadakathulla Musliyar. He studied under the guidance of Chalilakath Kunahmed Haji at Tirurangadi Tarammal Masjid Darse. He followed his teacher and later became his ardent support in Qiblal issue. He entered Darul Uloom Varakkad following the foot print of Chalilakath Kunahmed Haji and continued the course for three years.

Matrimonial life
He married Mariam, daughter of Ahmed Musliyar Chokli Katilpidikayil and became father of three sons and five daughters in this relation. Later he tied knot with Tattumma, daughter of Parappanangadi Kunnala and Abdul Rahman Musliyar was born in this relation.

In the service field
In 1912 CE (1331 AH), he started a Darse at Pannur and supervised it for fifteen years. He was appointed as principal in Darul Uloom Varakkad on 1345 and later shifted to Tanur Darse. After the retirement from the Tanur Darse, he indulged in the social works such as society reformation, establishment of the institutions and solving the issues. He was the prime advocate of Samastha Kerala Jamiyyathul Ulama and made his best in its formation.

Demise
He died in Shawwal 1965 CE (1385 AH), at his residence at Chokli

References

1881 births
1965 deaths
People from Kasaragod district
Indian Muslim scholars of Islam
20th-century Indian scholars
Scholars from Kerala
Kerala Sunni-Shafi'i scholars